Hassan Attia (born 1 January 1994) is an Egyptian basketball player who plays for Al-Ansar. Attia played two seasons of collegiate basketball for the Hartford Hawks

College career
Attia played two years for Colby Community College, before transferring to Hartford. In his senior year, he started in all 33 games. On 10 January 2018, he scored a career-high 20 points versus UMass Lowell. Attia finished as the number three all-time leader in blocks for Hartford, with 118 total blocks.

Professional career
In May 2021, Attia joined Senegalese champions AS Douanes on the roster for the 2022 BAL season.

BAL career statistics

|-
| style="text-align:left;"|2021
| style="text-align:left;"|AS Douanes
| 3 || 0 || 17.3 || .400 || – || .333 || 3.3 || .3 || 1.7 || 1.3 || 5.7
|-
|- class="sortbottom"
| style="text-align:center;" colspan="2"|Career
| 3 || 0 || 17.3 || .400 || – || .333 || 3.3 || .3 || 1.7 || 1.3 || 5.7

References

External links
Hassan Attia at Proballers

1994 births
Egyptian men's basketball players
Power forwards (basketball)
Sportspeople from Alexandria
AS Douanes basketball players
Living people
Egyptian expatriate basketball people in Senegal
Egyptian expatriate basketball people in Saudi Arabia
Egyptian expatriate basketball people in the United States